An endnote is a note or reference placed at the end of a text or major text section.

Endnote or EndNote may also refer to:

 Endnote (album), an album by Boston hardcore band The Hope Conspiracy
 EndNote, a reference management software package